Mulberry is an unincorporated community in Lincoln County, Tennessee, United States. Mulberry has a post office with ZIP code 37359, which opened on January 7, 1828. The community was named for the red mulberry plants found in the area.

References

Unincorporated communities in Lincoln County, Tennessee
Unincorporated communities in Tennessee